Henry Stuart (1853 – 26 December 1910) was an English-born Australian politician.

He was born at Southsea in Hampshire to estate agent Henry Stuart and Jane Doughty. He married Annie Turner around 1880 at the Isle of Wight; they had two children. After some years spent in the United States, he migrated first to South Australia and then to New South Wales, where he worked as a manufacturing chemist. Based in North Sydney, he was closely involved with the Labor Party, serving as president of the St Leonards Labor League. In 1900 he was appointed to the New South Wales Legislative Council, where he served until his death in North Sydney in 1910.

References

1853 births
1910 deaths
Members of the New South Wales Legislative Council
Australian Labor Party members of the Parliament of New South Wales